Delfim Ferreira (1888-1960) was an important Portuguese entrepreneur, born in the town of Riba d'Ave, Vila Nova de Famalição. He was the son of the great Portuguese industrial Narciso Ferreira, who, from a small manual mill, built the largest textile enterprise that existed in Portugal in the second half of the nineteenth century.

Educated at the  Royal and Imperial School of Reichenberg, Delfim Ferreira, in the 1940s, intended to build a commercial shopping mall in Porto. Delfim Ferreira expanded their business to other economic sectors, including the hydroelectric power and the civil construction, contributing to the development of Vale do Ave and providing employment to many thousands of workers.

He was awarded with the Grand Cross of the Order of Industrial Merit, the Military Order of Christ, the Great Officership of the Order of Industrial Merit and the Golden Medal of the city of Vila do Conde. When he died in 1960, Delfim Ferreira was considered to be the richest man in Portugal.

External links
Diário de Notícias Journal,  Website 
Correio do Minho Journal, Website

References

People from Vila Nova de Famalicão
20th-century Portuguese businesspeople
1888 births
1960 deaths